Omer Atzili (also spelt Omer Atsili or Omer Atzily, ; born 27 July 1993) is an Israeli professional footballer who plays as an attacking midfielder or as a winger for Israeli Premier League club Maccabi Haifa and the Israel national team.

Early life
Atzili was born in Holon, Israel, to a family of Ashkenazi Jewish (Romanian-Jewish) descent. His maternal grandfather was born in Bucharest, Romania.

He also holds a Romanian passport, on account of his Ashkenazi Jewish (Romanian-Jewish) ancestry, which eases the move to certain European football leagues.

Club career
Atzili started his career at Israeli side Maccabi Tel Aviv's youth setup in 2002. In 2010, he moved to Israeli side Hapoel Rishon LeZion, spending the last season out of three with them playing for both the youth and senior squads.

Hapoel Rishon LeZion
Atzili made his senior debut on 30 July 2011, coming on as a 77th minute substitute in a 2–1 home win against Hapoel Be'er Sheva, during the Israel Toto Cup for the Israeli Premier League clubs.

Atzili scored his first senior goal in the Israeli Premier League on 12 May 2012, in a 2–1 home loss against Hapoel Acre; his side also suffered relegation in the end of the season. He subsequently became an important unit for the club in Liga Leumit, scoring six goals as his side missed out promotion in the play-offs; highlights included a brace in a 2–2 draw at Maccabi Petah Tikva on 10 May 2013. Atzili helped his side win the 2012–13 Israel Toto Cup for the Israeli Liga Leumit clubs.

Beitar Jerusalem
On 30 July 2013, Atzili signed a four-year contract with Israeli Premier League club Beitar Jerusalem in the main category. He made his debut for the club on 24 August by starting in a 2–0 home loss against Hapoel Be'er Sheva, and was mainly used as a substitute during his first season.

Atzili only became an undisputed starter for Beitar Jerusalem in the 2015–16 season, where he scored a career-best seven goals. 

He also captained Beitar Jerusalem.

Granada
On 31 August 2016, Atzili signed a four-year deal with Spanish La Liga side Granada CF, for a rumoured fee of €750,000. He made his debut in the La Liga on 11 September, starting in a 2–1 home loss against SD Eibar.

Atzili played 11 total league and cup matches, starting five, for the Andalusian club. He did not manage to score, the club was relegated at the end of the 2016–17 season and Atzili left Granada.

Maccabi Tel Aviv
On 20 June 2017, Atzili signed a four-year deal with Israeli Premier League club Maccabi Tel Aviv.

APOEL
On 23 August 2020, Atzili signed a two-year contract with the Cypriot First Division club APOEL. In the mid-season transfer window he was released from his contract, leaving on 5 January 2021.

Maccabi Haifa
On 13 January 2021, Atzili signed a three-and-a-half-year deal with Israeli Premier League club Maccabi Haifa.

On 23 August 2022, Atzili assisted his team's last qualifying goal during their 2022–23 UEFA Champions League Play-offs second leg against Serbian side Red Star Belgrade, with a 90th minute free kick that made a rival player score an own goal, earning Maccabi Haifa a 2–2 away draw (5–4 on aggregate), and a place in the UEFA Champions League Group Stage. On 11 October 2022, Atzili scored both his first and second Champions League goals, by netting a brace in a 2–0 home win over Italian side Juventus, to be his club's first victory in the competition since the 2002–03 season. He also received UEFA's Player of the Match award for this game.

International career
He represented Israel internationally at youth levels from under-19 to under-21.

Atzili was first called-up to the Israeli senior national team on 31 August 2016, for a 2018 FIFA World Cup qualifiers match against Italy. He then made his senior debut with Israel on 5 September 2016, substituting Nir Bitton in a 1–3 home loss against Italy.

On November 10 2022, Atzili announced his retirement from the Israeli national team.

Personal life
He married his Israeli girlfriend Or Ben David in 2018. They have a son who was born in 2018. and a daughter born in 2020.

In June 2020, Atzili was investigated along with Dor Micha for having consensual intercourse with two minors aged under sixteen. Following the investigation, they were both removed from their club by Maccabi Tel Aviv owner Mitchell Goldhar. The State Prosecutor’s Office in September 2020 officially closed the cases against them. Police sources told the media that the reason cited for the closure was that the players provided proof, that each of the two girls had concealed the fact that they were minors at the time. Two years later, resurfaced texts revealed in 2022 showed that the players allegedly knew that the teens were underage students back then, which according to Haaretz contradicts previous claims. Each of them have issued several apologies over the years for any misconduct since the initial incident.

Honours
Hapoel Rishon LeZion
 Israel Toto Cup (Liga Leumit): 2012–13

Maccabi Tel Aviv
 Israeli Premier League: 2018–19, 2019–20
 Israel Toto Cup (Ligat Ha'Al): 2017–18, 2018–19

Maccabi Haifa
 Israeli Premier League: 2020–21, 2021–22
 Israel Toto Cup (Ligat Ha'Al): 2021–22
 Israel Super Cup: 2021

Individual
 Israeli Premier League Most Assists: 2020–21, 2021–22
 Israeli Premier League Top goalscorer: 2021–22
 Israeli Footballer of the Year: 2021–22

See also 
 List of Jewish footballers
 List of Jews in sports
 List of Israelis

References

External links

1993 births
Living people
Israeli Ashkenazi Jews
Israeli footballers
Association football wingers
Hapoel Rishon LeZion F.C. players
Beitar Jerusalem F.C. players
Granada CF footballers
Maccabi Tel Aviv F.C. players
APOEL FC players
Maccabi Haifa F.C. players
Liga Leumit players
Israeli Premier League players
La Liga players
Cypriot First Division players
Israel youth international footballers
Israel under-21 international footballers
Israel international footballers
Israeli expatriate footballers
Expatriate footballers in Spain
Expatriate footballers in Cyprus
Israeli expatriate sportspeople in Spain
Israeli expatriate sportspeople in Cyprus
Footballers from Holon
Israeli people of Romanian-Jewish descent
Israeli Jews
Jewish footballers
Israeli Footballer of the Year recipients